HD 129132 is a triple star system in the northern constellation of Boötes. It is dimly visible to the naked eye with a combined apparent visual magnitude of 6.13. The distance to this system is approximately 382 light years based on parallax, and it is drifting further away from the Sun with a radial velocity of +1.7 km/s.

This system was found to be a spectroscopic binary by the Dominion Astrophysical Observatory in 1923. It was then shown to be a triple star system in 1937 by William E. Harper and Guy H. Blanchet. The inner pair have an orbital period of 101.6 days and an eccentricity of 0.117, with the primary forming the visible component of this pair.

The primary component appears to be an aging giant star with a stellar classification of F4III, although it has also been classed as a G-type main-sequence star of type G0V. It is around a billion years old with twice the mass of the Sun. The star has expanded to 17 times the Sun's radius and is radiating 236 times the luminosity of the Sun at an effective temperature of 5,488 K. It is spinning with a projected rotational velocity of 25.3 km/s.

References 

G-type main-sequence stars
F-type giants
Spectroscopic binaries
Triple star systems
Boötes
Durchmusterung objects
129132
071729
5472